Δ9-Tetrahydrocannabutol (tetrahydrocannabinol-C4, THC-C4, Δ9-THCB, (C4)-Δ9-THC, butyl-THC) is a phytocannabinoid found in cannabis that is a homologue of tetrahydrocannabinol (THC), the main active component of Cannabis. Structurally, they are only different by the pentyl side chain being replaced by a butyl side chain.

Pharmacology 

Δ9-THCB, showed an affinity for the human CB1 (Ki = 15 nM) and CB2 receptors (Ki = 51 nM) comparable to that of Δ9-THC. The formalin test in vivo was performed on Δ9-THCB in order to reveal possible analgesic and anti-inflammatory properties. The tetrad test in mice showed a partial agonistic activity of Δ9-THCB toward the CB1 receptor. THCB has rarely been isolated from cannabis samples, but appears to be less commonly present than THC or THCV. It is metabolized in a similar manner to THC. 

In an analysis by the University of Rhode Island on phytocannabinoids it was found that THC-Butyl had the highest 3C-like protease inhibitor activity against COVID-19 out of all the phytocannabinoids tested within that study but not as high as the antiviral drug GC376 (81% THCB vs 100% GC376).

Chemistry 
Similarly to THC, it has 7 double bond isomers and 30 stereoisomers. The Δ8 isomer is known as a synthetic cannabinoid under the code name JWH-130, and the ring-opened analogue cannibidibutol is also known.

Legality
THCB is not scheduled internationally under the Convention on Psychotropic Substances, but may be controlled under analogue law in some individual jurisdictions as a homologue of THC.

See also 
 Cannabis
 Cannabinoid
 Parahexyl
 Perrottetinene
 Tetrahydrocannabihexol
 Tetrahydrocannabiphorol

References 

Terpeno-phenolic compounds
Cannabinoids
Diterpenes
Benzochromenes
Tetrahydrocannabinol